Jialu is a railway station on the Taiwan Railways Administration South-link line located in Fangshan Township, Pingtung County, Taiwan.

History
The station was opened on 5 October 1992.

See also
 List of railway stations in Taiwan

References

1992 establishments in Taiwan
Railway stations opened in 1992
Railway stations served by Taiwan Railways Administration
Railway stations in Pingtung County